is a Japanese former professional baseball infielder, coach, and manager. He spent all of his playing career with the Nishitetsu Lions of Nippon Professional Baseball, and served as player-manager of the team from 1962 to 1969. Nakanishi also managed the Nippon Ham-Fighters, Hanshin Tigers, Yakult Swallows, and Chiba Lotte Marines. He coached for the Swallows, Kintetsu Buffaloes, Yomiuri Giants, and Orix BlueWave.

Playing career
Nakanishi began playing baseball in junior high school. At the time, his team did not have any baseball equipment. The group practiced side by side with the American soldiers stationed in Japan after World War II. Nakanishi and his teammates would pick up and practice with baseballs military personnel had left behind. During his high school baseball career, Nakanishi played in the Japanese High School Baseball Championship three times. He had planned to attend Waseda University, but his parents negotiated Nakanishi's first contract with the Nishitetsu Lions without his consent. He hit 12 home runs in his rookie season and subsequently decided to hone his power stroke. Due to his small build, Nakanishi had to twist and contort his body during at bats to generate power. He came close to the Triple Crown in four seasons, (1953, 1955, 1956, 1958) but never won. In 1953, Isami Okamoto led the league in hits, while Nakanishi finished second. In 1955, Nakanishi lost the RBI title to Kazuhiro Yamauchi. The next year, he finished second in batting average to teammate Yasumitsu Toyoda. In 1958, Takao Katsuragi denied Nakanishi the RBI title for the second time. Nakanishi was spiked during the 1959 season, and suffered tendonitis in his wrist in 1960. He played through the wrist injury in a bid to improve his arm strength. However, both injuries sapped his effectiveness as a player and he succeeded Tokuji Kawasaki as Lions' manager in 1962, playing the field occasionally until 1969.

Personal
For most of his own playing career, Nakanishi was managed by Osamu Mihara. Nakanishi married Mihara's daughter Toshiko in 1956.

References

External links

Baseball Library

1933 births
Living people
Baseball people from Kagawa Prefecture
Nishitetsu Lions players
Hanshin Tigers managers
Hokkaido Nippon-Ham Fighters managers
Tokyo Yakult Swallows managers
Chiba Lotte Marines managers
Nippon Professional Baseball infielders
Japanese Baseball Hall of Fame inductees
Japanese baseball players
Baseball player-managers
Nippon Professional Baseball Rookie of the Year Award winners
Nippon Professional Baseball MVP Award winners
People from Takamatsu, Kagawa